The 1959 BRSCC British Saloon Car Championship was the second season of the championship. It began at Goodwood on 30 March and finished at Brands Hatch on 29 August. Jeff Uren became the second BSCC champion, thanks to his domination of Class C in his Ford Zephyr.

Calendar & Winners
All races were held in the United Kingdom. Overall winners of multi-class races in bold.

Championship results

References

External links 

Official website of the British Touring Car Championship

British Touring Car Championship seasons
British Saloon Car Championship